Pamela Mary Royds (née Maycock; 17 August 1924 – 31 May 2016) was a British publisher and children's book editor.

Early life
Royds was born in London, the daughter of Lilian (née Youngman) and Thomas Maycock, who ran a Smithfield Market import business. She was educated at Eothen School, Caterham, and St Hugh's College, Oxford.

Career
In 1964, Royds joined the British publishing firm André Deutsch to stand in for the then editor, Philippa Pearce, while on maternity leave. The poet Michael Rosen credits Royds with "discovering" him, after being rejected by several other publishers.

Personal life
In 1952, she married Alex Royds, an Eastern Daily Press journalist, and they had three daughters and a son together.

References

1924 births
2016 deaths
Alumni of St Hugh's College, Oxford
British book publishers (people)
People educated at Caterham School
Women book publishers (people)
English book editors
Women print editors
Place of death missing
Publishers (people) from London
20th-century English businesspeople